Izatha convulsella is a moth of the family Oecophoridae. It is endemic to New Zealand. It is similar in appearance to its close relative Izatha gekkonella but is slightly larger and more white/grey in appearance and is more wide spread in geographic range than its close relative.

Taxonomy 

This species was first described by Francis Walker in 1864 under the name Gelechia convulsella. Walker based his description on specimens collected in Nelson by Mr Oxley. These specimens are held at the Natural History Museum, London.

Description 
The wingspan is 14–20 mm for males and 13.5–19 mm for females. Adults are on wing from late September to February. This species is very similar in appearance to its close relation I. gekkonella. The most accurate way to confirm the identity of specimens is by dissection of the male genitalia as I. convulsella has a comb like structure in the reproductive organ of the males of the species. Generally I. convulsella is slightly larger than I. gekkonella and has fewer yellow-tipped grey scales and so has a more white and grey appearance in comparison to the I. gokkonella which, as a result of having a larger quantity of these scales, has a more brownish appearance. I. convulsella also has lighter coloured hindwings in comparison to I. gekkonella.

Geographic range 
This species is endemic to New Zealand. It is widespread in the eastern part of the South Island. In the North Island, it has only been recorded from Wellington, Ōtaki, Palmerston North, Taihape and Waipawa. This species is not found in Auckland.

Host species 

Larvae have been recorded living under the bark of Dacrydium cupressinum. The true food plant may be lichens growing on the bark.

References

Oecophorinae
Endemic fauna of New Zealand
Endemic moths of New Zealand